Niederdorla is a village and a former municipality in the Unstrut-Hainich-Kreis district of Thuringia, Germany. It is the geographical center of Germany. Its nearest main city is Erfurt, which also is the capital city of Thuringia. Since 31 December 2012, it has been part of the municipality Vogtei.

Geographical center
Niederdorla claims to be the most central municipality in Germany. A plaque was erected and a lime tree planted at  after the 1990 German reunification. The point was confirmed as the centroid of the extreme coordinates by the Dresden University of Technology.

People from Niederdorla 
 Matthias Weckmann, born Niederdorla ca. 1616, died 1674 in Hamburg - Baroque organist and composer

See also
 Central Germany (geography)

References

Former municipalities in Thuringia
Geographical centres